San Jose/Glen Park station is a light rail stop on the Muni Metro J Church line, located in the Glen Park neighborhood of San Francisco, California. The station is located in the median of the freeway section of San Jose Avenue. A footbridge connects the two side platforms to surface streets and Glen Park station.

J Church and N Judah trains began using the extension of the J Church line along San Jose Avenue for carhouse moves on August 31, 1991. Although these trips were open to passengers, the extension and its stops did not open for full-time service until June 19, 1993.

In March 2014, Muni released details of the proposed implementation of their Transit Effectiveness Project (later rebranded MuniForward), which included a variety of stop changes for the J Church line. No changes were proposed for San Jose/Glen Park.

References

External links 

SFMTA – San Jose Ave and Ocean Ave inbound and outbound
SFBay Transit (unofficial) – San Jose Ave & Ocean Ave

Muni Metro stations
Railway stations in the United States opened in 1991